Animas Forks is a ghost town located twelve miles (19 km) northeast of Silverton in San Juan County, Colorado, United States. The area is managed by the Bureau of Land Management. At over 11,000 feet, Animas Forks is one of the highest mining camps in the Western US.

Location
Animas Forks is located on a system of roads known as the Alpine Loop. The loop is a  system of unpaved roads which connects the small mountain towns of Lake City, Ouray, and Silverton. Most of the land in the area is managed by either the U.S. Forest Service or the Bureau of Land Management. The Alpine Loop is visited by over 100,000 people each year.

The unimproved road from Silverton to Animas Forks is passable in summer by two-wheel drive vehicles. The road beyond Animas Forks over Engineer Pass to Lake City may require four-wheel drive.  Low clearance cars will find the Alpine Loop extremely difficult or impossible.

History

The town's first log cabin was built in 1873 and by 1876 the community had become a bustling mining community. At that time the town contained 30 cabins, a hotel, a general store, a saloon, and a post office. By 1883, 450 people lived in Animas Forks and in 1882 a newspaper, the Animas Forks Pioneer, began publication and lasted until October 1886. Every fall the residents of Animas Forks migrated en masse to the warmer town of Silverton. Mining, speculation and processing mills helped Animas Forks grow.

Decline
When mining profits began to decline investment in Animas Forks was no longer justified. Although mining made a brief 1904 rebound with the construction of the Gold Prince Mill the town's mining days were nearing an end. The Silverton Northern Railroad built to the area in 1896 and stimulated interest in mining in the community again but the railroad never reached its expectations. The Gold Prince Mill closed in 1910 and in 1917 most of the mill's major parts were removed for a new facility in Eureka. The mill's dismantling signalled the beginning of the end for Animas Forks. The town was a ghost town by the 1920s.

Today

The site continues as a tourist attraction. A Colorado State Historical Fund grant to San Juan County, in cooperation with the Bureau of Land Management, provided for stabilization of the remaining structures in 1997 and 1998.  In 2011 the townsite was listed on the National Register of Historic Places which opened up opportunities for additional funding. The initial stabilization effort of the late 1990s was followed up with a comprehensive restoration of the buildings in 2013–2014.  Work identified in the 2009 Historic Structures Assessment was completed under two subsequent grants from the State Historical Fund, beginning in 2013.  Work was completed in 2014, just in time for the recognition of the 25th Anniversary of the establishment of the Alpine Loop Scenic Byway.

The site was managed collaboratively by the Bureau of Land Management (BLM) and San Juan County until a long-awaited land swap was recently completed in 2009.  The BLM is now the sole owner of the Townsite, and provides interpretive brochures and maps at an adjacent parking area.  Entry into the buildings is unrestricted.  The nine standing buildings within the Townsite have been stabilized and restored, repairing floors, walls, windows, and doors, to secure the envelope  of each building.  Cedar shingle roof sheathing has been restored on several of the buildings along with structural repairs and improvements to the drainage around the structures and across the site.  The jail structure, the oldest building on the site, has had it gable roof reconstructed as part of the second phase of the project along with new interpretive signage installed in 2014.

Historic photos, 1878 to 1904

See also
List of ghost towns in Colorado

References

External links

Tour of Animas Forks and the Alpine Loop Indications at BLM
Photos from 2005 and 2007 of Animas Forks Colorado Ghost Town site provided By Rocky Mountain Profiles
Full Resolution Ghost Town and Historic Site Photos by Coloradopast.com

Protected areas of San Juan County, Colorado
Ghost towns in Colorado
Bureau of Land Management areas in Colorado
Former populated places in San Juan County, Colorado
San Juan County, Colorado